The 4th Silver City Trophy was a motor race, run to Formula One rules, held on 10 October 1959 at Snetterton Circuit, Norfolk. The race was run over 25 laps of the circuit, and was won by British driver Ron Flockhart in a BRM P25. Flockhart also took pole and fastest lap.

There were also several Formula Two entries in the field. Chris Bristow was highest-placed in that category, driving a Cooper T51, and fifth overall.

Results 
''Note: a blue background indicates a car running under Formula 2 regulations.

References 

Silver City Trophy
Silver City Trophy
Silver City Trophy